The 1960 Navy Midshipmen football team represented the United States Naval Academy as an independent in the 1960 NCAA University Division football season. The offense scored 262 points while the defense allowed 103 points. Led by head coach Wayne Hardin, the Midshipmen finished the season with nine wins and an appearance in the Orange Bowl.

The Midshipmen were Lambert Trophy co-champions with undefeated Yale. Senior halfback Joe Bellino was awarded the Heisman Trophy and the Maxwell Award.

Navy upset third-ranked Washington  which vaulted them up eleven places in the rankings, to sixth. They played Air Force for the first time this season,  in mid-October in Baltimore as Bellino scored three touchdowns and made an interception, all in the first half.

Schedule

Roster

1961 NFL Draft

Awards and honors
 Joe Bellino – Heisman Trophy, Maxwell Award

References

Navy
Navy Midshipmen football seasons
Lambert-Meadowlands Trophy seasons
Navy Midshipmen football